George Gage or Hori Te Kou-o-rehua Keeti (probably born in 1895 or 1896 – 3 June 1961) was a New Zealand Māori healer, tohunga and Ringatū minister. He identified with the Ngāti Maniapoto, Te Whakatōhea and Te Whānau-ā-Apanui iwi. He was born in Kihikihi, Waikato, New Zealand c.1896 and died in Opotiki.

References

1890s births
1961 deaths
New Zealand Ringatū clergy
Ngāti Maniapoto people
Whakatōhea people
Te Whānau-ā-Apanui people
Tohunga
People from Kihikihi